Kinfolk is an independent slow lifestyle magazine, published by Ouur, based in Portland, Oregon.

The magazine 
Kinfolk was founded in July 2011 by two couples: Nathan Williams and Katie Searle-Williams, and Doug and Paige Bischoff. A lifestyle magazine aimed primarily at young professionals, it focuses on home, work, play, food and community through photo essays, recipes, interviews, profiles, personal stories and practical tips. An international pool of writers, photographers, designers, and chefs contribute to Kinfolk. Typically, more than 50 individuals contribute to each issue.

Released quarterly, each issue is seasonally themed, with all food, entertainment,  and lifestyle content geared towards that theme. Articles  include interviews with well-known chefs, accompanied by themed menus with recipes, illustrated guides to daily encounters and inspirational photo essays encouraging readers to try new activities.

In addition to its print publication, Kinfolk organizes monthly "community gathering" events that take place around the world, each based on a seasonal theme such as flower potlucks, butcher's block parties and campfire cooking. These events take place concurrently and aim to unite the global community of Kinfolk readers while also offering practical advice and lessons. The company also produces international food-based workshops, cookbooks and a short film series.

Reception
Kinfolk has been praised for the quality of its graphic design and its photography. In 2014, Benjamin Teppler, writing in the Portland Monthly, described it as having created "a distinct ripple in the publishing world" with "an aesthetic all its own." Tim Murphy, a reporter for The New York Times, called it "the Martha Stewart Living of the Portland Set", writing that the city "may have officially out-twee'd itself" with Kinfolk.

International versions
Kinfolk has an international readership. In addition to English, the magazine has published Chinese, Japanese, and Korean editions.

Books

Since 2013, Kinfolk has produced several books:

The Kinfolk Table: Recipes for Small Gatherings (Artisan Books, 2013), containing 85 traditional recipes contributed by its global readership.
The Kinfolk Home: Interiors for Slow Living (Artisan Books, 2015), an interior design survey of international scope. 
The Kinfolk Entrepreneur: Ideas for Meaningful Work (Artisan Books, 2017). 
The Kinfolk Garden: How to Live with Nature (Artisan Books, 2020).
Kinfolk Travel: Slower Ways to See the World (Artisan Books, 2021), a book of travel planning tips.

Other magazines
In June 2021, Kinfolk published the first issue of Kindling, a magazine for 'people with children'. As of July 2022, three issues of Kindling have been published.

List of Issues

References

External links
Kinfolk website

2011 establishments in Oregon
Lifestyle magazines published in the United States
Magazines established in 2011
Magazines published in Portland, Oregon
Quarterly magazines published in the United States